Thomas Kenrick Kavanagh (12 December 1923 – 26 November 2019) was an Australian Grand Prix motorcycle road racer and racecar driver.

In 1952, Kavanagh became the first Australian to win a motorcycle Grand Prix race when he won the 350cc Ulster Grand Prix. In 1956, he won the Junior TT at the Isle of Man TT races. Kavanagh entered two Formula One Grands Prix in 1958 with his own Maserati 250F, firstly in Monaco where he failed to qualify, and lastly in the Belgian Grand Prix where he missed out on the race having blown his engine in practice, after having qualified 20th of 28 entrants.

Personal life
Kavanagh died in Bergamo, Italy on 26 November 2019.

Motorcycle Grand Prix results
Points system from 1950 to 1968

5 best results were counted up until 1955.

(key) (Races in italics indicate fastest lap)

Complete Formula One World Championship results
(key)

Complete Formula One Non-Championship results
(key) (Races in bold indicate pole position)
(Races in italics indicate fastest lap)

References

1923 births
2019 deaths
Racing drivers from Melbourne
Australian motorcycle racers
125cc World Championship riders
250cc World Championship riders
350cc World Championship riders
500cc World Championship riders
Isle of Man TT riders
Australian Formula One drivers